Jackie Norris (born 1970) is a  political aide, educator and corporate strategist in the United States. She served as the assistant to President Barack Obama and Chief of Staff to First Lady Michelle Obama. Jackie is the current CEO and president of Goodwill of Central Iowa.

Biography

Norris was born in Ossining, New York and earned a degree in political science from the State University of New York at Geneseo in 1992. She received her secondary teaching certification in 2001 from Iowa State University and a Masters in Political Science from Iowa State University in 2008.

Norris began her career in the office of Congresswoman Louise M. Slaughter (D-NY) in 1992. She later served as Vice President Al Gore’s scheduler and events planner and as Director of Scheduling and Advance for HUD Secretary Andrew Cuomo. In 1998, Norris served as finance director for Governor Tom Vilsack’s gubernatorial campaign in Iowa and as Iowa state political director on Al Gore’s 2000 Presidential campaign.

In 2002, Norris became a classroom teacher for history and government at three high schools in Perry, Ames and Johnston, Iowa, after receiving her secondary education teacher certification from Iowa State University. She is the 2005 award recipient of the James Madison Fellowship, which is awarded to individuals with a desire to become outstanding teachers of the American Constitution at the secondary level. Norris recently stepped down from her 2-year tenure as an adjunct professor at American University.

During the 2008 presidential campaign, Norris was President Barack Obama's Iowa State Director after being his Iowa Senior Advisor during the caucus campaign. Norris served as First Lady Michelle Obama's White House Chief of Staff.

Norris later served as Senior Advisor to the CEO at the Corporation for National and Community Service, to advance the Administration’s work on national and community service and support the implementation of the Serve America Act. Norris recently stepped down as the founding Executive Director of the Points of Light Corporate Institute.

Family
Norris is married to John R. Norris, former Commissioner at the Federal Energy Regulatory Commission (FERC) and now Minister Counselor to the 
United States Mission to the United Nations (USUN) in Rome, Italy. Norris has three sons; Hunter, Cole and Sam.

References

External links
https://www.dmgoodwill.org/our-impact/meet-our-president/
 Iowa teacher selected as Michelle Obama Chief of Staff
 Jackie Norris quoted about Points of Light work (Businessweek, Nov 8, 2012)
 Norris leaving the White House 
 Jackie Norris quoted about 2016 race (AP, Nov 4, 2012)
 Jackie Norris on the Civic 50 (Nonprofit Times, Nov 9, 2012)
 Interview about the future of volunteering
 A First Lady Who Demands Substance (Washington Post, June 25, 2009)
 Jackie Norris's Points of Light Bio
Jackie Norris (with Nicole Trimble) on Harnessing the Benefit of Employee Volunteering at Mid-Size Companies
Jackie Norris: Creating a Standard for Doing Well by Doing Good
Jackie Norris on "Let's Talk Live" discussing the 2013 National Conference on Volunteering and Service
Jackie Norris discussing the 2013 National Day of Service
Volunteer to Get Out of the Box

Obama administration personnel
Year of birth uncertain
Living people
1970 births